Wang Meng (born 2 October 1988) is a Chinese wheelchair curling player. 
She participated at the 2018 Winter Paralympics and won a gold medal.

References

External links 

 Player profile, pyeongchang2018.com

1988 births
Living people
Chinese female curlers
Chinese wheelchair curlers
Paralympic wheelchair curlers of China
Paralympic medalists in wheelchair curling
Paralympic gold medalists for China
Wheelchair curlers at the 2018 Winter Paralympics
Medalists at the 2018 Winter Paralympics
Paralympians from Pizhou
21st-century Chinese women